John Edward Bairstow (February 7, 1902 – October 28, 1963) was an American lawyer and politician.

Born in Waukegan, Illinois, Bairstow received his law degree from University of Illinois College of Law in 1925 and then practiced law in Waukegan. He was the corporate counsel for the City of Waukegan and city attorney for Highland, Illinois. He was a Democrat. He served in the Illinois House of Representatives from 1953 until his death in 1963. He died in Waukegan, Illinois of circulatory problems.

Notes

External links

1902 births
1963 deaths
People from Waukegan, Illinois
University of Illinois College of Law alumni
Illinois lawyers
Democratic Party members of the Illinois House of Representatives
20th-century American lawyers
20th-century American politicians
People from Highland, Illinois